L' Amore di Norma is a 1951 Italian musical film drama directed and written  by Giuseppe De Martino. The film stars Lori Landi and Gino Mattera.

Cast
Lori Landi as  Norma Randi
Gino Mattera as  Stefano Silva
Jacqueline Pierreux as Jeannette
Franca Mazzoni as Zia Francesca
Afro Poli as Marco
Germaine Del Signore as  Miss Madison
Gabriele Testas as  Narciso
Guido Celano as  D'Emilis
T. Germi
Tony D'Angelo
Carlo Mazzoni
Rossana Higgins
Pina Malgarini
Enrico Formichi
Gipsy Kiss
Paola Bertini
Aldo Silvani
Gino Del Signore

External links
 

1950 films
1950s Italian-language films
Italian black-and-white films
1950s musical drama films
Italian musical drama films
1950 drama films
1950s Italian films